Guinea coup d'état may refer to:
 1979 Equatorial Guinea coup d'état
 1980 Guinea-Bissau coup d'état
 1984 Guinean coup d'état
 2003 Guinea-Bissau coup d'état
 2004 Equatorial Guinea coup d'état attempt
 2008 Guinean coup d'état
 2010 Guinea-Bissau military unrest
 2012 Guinea-Bissau coup d'état
 2021 Guinean coup d'état